Anlezark is a surname. Notable people with the surname include:

Justin Anlezark (born 1977), Australian shot putter
Arthur Anlezark (1882–1961), Australian rugby footballer

See also
 Anglezarke